"Got What I Got" is a song written by Thomas Archer, Alexander Palmer and Michael Tyler, and recorded by American country music singer Jason Aldean. It was released in April 2020 as the second single from his ninth studio album 9.

Peaking at #16 on the Billboard Hot 100, it became his highest-charting single since 2014's "Burnin' It Down" peaked at #12.

Background And Content
The song explains how the narrator (Aldean) does not miss what he had in life before his current family, and though it took a lot to get there, he would do it all again to get back to where he is today. Aldean has said that it is his wife's favorite song on the album, stating that it is due to the fact that she doesn't like country music that much and prefers the "hip hop" sound of this song.

Charts

Weekly charts

Year-end charts

Certifications

References

2019 songs
2020 singles
BBR Music Group singles
Jason Aldean songs
Song recordings produced by Michael Knox (record producer)
Country ballads